London is the debut studio album by British punk rock band Apologies, I Have None, released on 19 March 2012. The CD was self-released, and the vinyl by Household Name Records. The album's artwork was done by friend of the band, Emma Smith.

Track listing

Personnel
 
 Dan Bond - vocals, guitar
 Josh Mckenzie - vocals, guitar
 PJ Shepherd - bass, vocals
 Joe Watson - drums, vocals

Release history
London was released in the UK in 2012.

References

External links 
Bands Website
Youtube

2012 debut albums
Apologies, I Have None albums
Household Name Records albums
Self-released albums